Walter Vivien Aston (born 16 October 1928 in Coseley, Tipton, Staffordshire, England) was a footballer who played in The Football League for Bury and Oldham Athletic. He also played for Bournemouth & Boscombe Athletic and Chester City.

References

English footballers
Bury F.C. players
Oldham Athletic A.F.C. players
AFC Bournemouth players
Chester City F.C. players
English Football League players
20th-century births
1999 deaths
Sportspeople from Tipton
Association football defenders